Gösta Erik Sundqvist (May 17, 1957, Espoo – August 16, 2003) was a Finnish musician and radio personality. He was the lead singer for Leevi and the Leavings since the forming of the band. The name "Leevi" is often taken to mean Sundqvist personally, although this is incorrect, and "Leevi" refers to a late friend of the band members. Sundqvist kept himself almost completely hidden from publicity and Leevi and the Leavings never performed in front of a live audience, with only one exception under the name "Tarmo Dynamo". In the 1980s and 90s, Gösta and the band gave some interviews but after the year 1996 Sundqvist became a total media hermit.

Sundqvist is best remembered by the songs he composed, arranged, and wrote the lyrics for. His lyrics were down-to-earth which was probably the key to success among the Finnish public. His subjects covered loneliness, sexuality, alcoholism, mental health, environment and society, often with sarcasm and black humour. In 1990 Sundqvist expanded his work to include radio comedy. He wrote several humorous shows for the radio station formerly known as Radiomafia, including Tietokoneenkorjauskurssi ("Computer repair course") and Koe-eläinpuisto ("Laboratory animal park").

Leevi and the Leavings started their career at the end of the 1970s, but became popular in wider circles in the second half of the 80s. Their first hits included "Pohjois-Karjala",  "Teuvo, maanteiden kuningas", "Sopivasti lihava", "Amalia" and "Rin Tin Tin".

Sundqvist also wrote songs for "singer" Aarne Tenkanen, a pseudonym of Kai Järvinen. Tenkanen was originally one of the characters appearing in  Sundqvist's radio shows.

Gösta Sundqvist died abruptly from a heart attack at his home in Espoo on August 16, 2003, at only 46 years old. Only hours before his death, he was in a studio recording a new version of a Leavings song meant to appear on their next single.

References

1957 births
2003 deaths
People from Espoo
20th-century Finnish male singers
Swedish-speaking Finns